The School of Visual Concepts in Seattle, Washington, is a vocational school training students and working professionals in the fields of user experience, content strategy/design, writing for user experience, graphic design, web design, and marketing communications.

Founded in 1971 by the husband-and-wife team of illustrators, Dick and Cherry Brown, the school's teaching philosophy is based on the premise that working professionals, not career teachers or full-time faculty, can provide the most current, relevant instruction. As such, SVC does not offer degrees, but does provide students with the ability to earn a certificate in their program of study.

In addition to evening courses and daytime workshops in the marketing communications field, SVC also had one of the largest public letterpress printing teaching shops in the Pacific Northwest region of the United States. As of 2020, letterpress classes are offered by Partners in Print.

The school closed their building during the COVID 19 pandemic and currently only offers online classes and workshops.

Notable alums include best-selling children's author, Leslie Patricelli.

External links

School of Visual Concepts

Education in Washington (state)
Universities and colleges in Seattle
Design schools in the United States
Educational institutions established in 1971